This is a list of cities in the Turks and Caicos Islands:

 Back Salina
Blue Hills 
 Blue Mountain
 Bottle Creek
 Breezy Brae
 Chalk Sound
 Cheshire Hall
 Cockburn Harbour (South Caicos Town)
 Cockburn Town
 Discovery Bay
 Downtown
 Five Cays
 Grace Bay
 Great Salina
 Honda Road
 Juba
Kew
 Kew Town
 Leeward
 Long Bay Hill
 Middle Caicos
 North Creek
 Out North
 Overback
 Parrot Cay
 Salt Cay
 Sandy Point
 The Bight
 The Ridge
 West Road
 Wheeland
Whitby

 
Turks and Caicos
Cities